The flag of Zanzibar was adopted on 9 January 2005. It is a horizontal tricolour of blue, black, and green with the national flag of Tanzania in the canton.

Historical flags
Zanzibar was a part of the Sultanate of Muscat and Oman, which flew a plain red flag, beginning in 1698. Majid bin Said declared an independent Sultanate of Zanzibar on 2 November 1856 but did not adopt a new flag. The red flag remained in use during the British protectorate period. When Zanzibar gained independence from the United Kingdom on 10 December 1963, a green disk with two yellow cloves was added to the flag.

On 12 January 1964, John Okello overthrew the Sultan of Zanzibar and adopted a black-yellow-blue tricolour as the flag of the People's Republic of Zanzibar. On 29 January, the country's flag was changed to a blue-black-green tricolour. This design, which was based on the flag of the Afro-Shirazi Party, was the longest-lived of the post-independence flags and eventually formed the basis for the current flag. On 26 April 1964, Zanzibar united with Tanganyika to form the new country of Tanzania and Zanzibar's old flag fell out of use.

References

Flags of Africa
Flag
Flags introduced in 2005